USAT J. W. McAndrew was a Type C3-P&C troop ship for the United States Army during World War II.

The ship was built by the Bethlehem Sparrows Point Shipyard of Baltimore in 1940 as SS Deltargentino for the United States Maritime Commission on behalf of the Mississippi Shipping Company in 1940 for operation by its Delta Line. The ship was delivered to Mississippi Shipping in November 1940.

Deltargentino  was among the ships designated for the Army among the twenty-eight merchant vessels (twenty-one for the Navy and seven to the Army) requisitioned by the Maritime Commission's Division of Emergency Shipping announced on 4 June 1941.

The Army acquired Deltargentino in New Orleans on 28 June 1941 giving it the name J. W. McAndrew honoring Major General James William McAndrew. The ship was quickly converted for troop transport and made four voyages between New Orleans and Cristobal, Panama Canal Zone. In November the transport was assigned to the New York Port of Embarkation from which it made trips to Puerto Rico, Jamaica, the Canal Zone, Trinidad, and New Orleans.

In late January 1942 the transport left New York for Australia returning in April and then in May transported troops to Iceland and Glasgow. From Glasgow the ship went to Cape Town, South Africa, before returning to New York in August to prepare for the invasion of North Africa 8–16 November 1942. After the landing the transport returned to New York to make regular voyages to African and European ports until May–June 1944 when the ship underwent major repairs. The ship would have been transferred to the Navy and named USS J. W. McAndrew (AP-47) in 1943, but this was cancelled. The major ports served between the North African landings and the end of the war were Oran, Casablanca, Algiers, Gibraltar, Belfast, the Clyde, Naples, Plymouth and Southampton and after the Normandy landings Cherbourg and Le Havre.

On 13 March 1945 in convoy during a storm the   lost steering and collided with the transport resulting in the loss of 68 troops and one Naval Armed Guardsman. The destroyer escorts Earl K. Olsen and Roche rescued some men from the water. The transport put into Ponta Delgada, Azores for repairs before undergoing hull repairs at Bethlehem, Baltimore during May and June 1945. After repairs the transport made voyages out of the Hampton Roads Port of Embarkation going to Naples in July then making voyages from there and New York to Italian and French ports including Marseille through 1946.

J. W. McAndrew was returned to the Maritime Administration (MARAD) on 5 May 1947 as surplus and allocated by MARAD to Farrell Lines for operation by its American South African Line. The line purchased the ship on 22 December 1948 renaming it African Enterprise for operation until 22 September 1960 when the ship was traded in for credit. The ship was laid up in the James River National Defense Reserve Fleet 19 October, withdrawn briefly 28 September to 6 October 1966 for Navy to remove a spare tail shaft.  On 9 April 1969 the ship was one of three sold for $191,666.66 as scrap to The Boston Metals Company. The ship was withdrawn from the fleet for scrapping on 8 May 1969. The ship was broken up in Baltimore in February 1972.

References

Bibliography

 
 
 
 
 
 

 

Type C3-P&C ships of the United States Army
Ships built in Sparrows Point, Maryland
1940 ships
World War II auxiliary ships of the United States
Maritime incidents in March 1945